Omar Degan (born June 1990) is an Italian-born Somali architect, author and academic, he is the principal and founder of DO Architecture Group. 
Known for his work in Africa and in particular in the horn of Africa, Omar specialized in fragile contexts and urban resilience with a particular focus on minorities and marginalized communities. His work aims to highlight the beauty of our cultural diversity and how architecture could become a means to support peace, development and fight against climate change.

Early life and education

Degan was born in Italy to Somali parents in June 1990. He studied architecture first at the Politecnico di Torino, and later at the Chinese University of Hong Kong.

Career
Following graduate school, Degan worked on projects to upgrade slums in Buenos Aires and Hong Kong.

Born in Italy in 1990, Omar dedicated his career to the study of emergency contexts and developing countries focusing on the interactions between cultural diversity and architecture as a mean to support the fight against climate change. 
The principle of his firm, which is based between Somalia, USA and Italy, lies in designing culturally, historically and climatically relevant solutions to social problems around the world, with a particular focus on the most vulnerable communities and minorities. 
With his work, he seeks to develop new ways to celebrate the cultural identity of communities around the world through the use of architecture, supporting peace, development and a more sustainable future.
In his Tedx "Architecture Identity and Reconstructing Somalia," he highlighted the power of culture and traditions in architecture and how design can become a tool to promote peace and development around the world. 
His work has been recognized internationally and has been considered one of the emergent voices of African architecture. His projects include a schools, restaurants and private houses. In 2021 due to the medical crisis in Somalia he designed a portable clinic to facilitate medical aids in rural areas.

In 2017 he received attention for his proposed memorial to the 14 October 2017 Mogadishu bombings.

In 2020 he published the book Mogadishu through the eyes of an architect.

References

External links
Official site

Living people
1990 births
Architects from Turin
21st-century Italian architects
21st-century Somalian people
Somalian architects